Kim Prevost and Bill Solley are an American jazz duo consisting of singer-songwriter Kim Prevost (born April 27, 1968, in New Orleans, Louisiana)  
and guitarist-composer-Visual Artist https://fineartamerica.com/profiles/bill-solley  Bill Solley (born December 13, 1957, in Jacksonville, Florida).

Music career
Guitarist Bill Solley met singer Kim Prevost at an audition in New Orleans in 1996.
Before this, Solley studied classical guitar at the University of New Orleans and was a session guitarist with Allen Toussaint.
Prevost performed musical theatre in New Orleans, in a Cole Porter review under the direction of Allen Toussaint, and leading roles in "Sweet Charity", "Dreamgirls", "West Side Story", and "A Dose of Reality".

Prevost and Solley first performed as a duo in between sets of Summers Heat, Bill Summers' band, in which they both performed as well.
Kim and Bill won the "Black Entertainment Television on Jazz" Jazz Discovery Award in 1999. 
Prevost and Solley were married in 2000 in New Orleans.

Prevost listened to Ella Fitzgerald and Billie Holiday as she shaped her own style which materialized as a crackling mixture of jazz, blues, funk and R&B – tinged gospel.

Solley's musicianship is truly amazing, as he works melody, improvisations and baseline simultaneously with virtuosity and ardor on his trademark 7-string guitar.

Kim and Bill relocated to Houston, Texas after Hurricane Katrina destroyed their home in New Orleans in 2005.
Kim and Bill continue to tour and perform both in the Houston area and throughout the world.

Discography

Kim Prevost and Bill Solley albums

Kim Prevost solo albums

Bill Solley solo albums

References

External links 
 

American jazz ensembles from New Orleans
Musical groups from New Orleans
Musical groups established in 1996
Musical groups from Houston
American musical duos
1996 establishments in Louisiana